Jõhvi FC Phoenix is an Estonian football club based in Jõhvi. 

The club was founded as Jõhvi FC Lokomotiv in 2011 on the basis of former football club Jõhvi JK Orbiit. They finished the 2013 season as Esiliiga runners-up and were promoted to the Estonian top division for the 2014 season. They were relegated after a single season, being defeated in the relegation play-offs by Viljandi Tulevik. Due to financial problems, the club was initially relegated to the fourth level for 2015 and after two seasons on lower levels, their players joined Kohtla-Järve JK Järve in 2017. In 2018, the club was renamed to Jõhvi FC Phoenix and continued with only youth players. Club rejoined senior league system from 2020 in III liiga.

Players

Current squad
 ''As of 24 August 2016.

Seasons and statistics

References

External links
Home page
Jõhvi FC Lokomotiv at Estonian Football Association
Jõhvi FC Phoenix at Estonian Football Association

Football clubs in Estonia
Association football clubs established in 2011
Jõhvi
Meistriliiga clubs